Hansel and Gretel is a 1954 stop-motion animated theatrical feature film released by RKO Radio Pictures.

Production 

The film is based on Engelbert Humperdinck's opera Hänsel und Gretel, from which its music derives. It was the first American feature-length animated film not made by Disney since 1941's Mr. Bug Goes to Town and the first American feature-length animated film not made with traditional animation.

In 1952, Evalds Dajevskis began working for Myerberg Productions to conceptualize the look of the film and design the miniature sets. Dajevskis built the sets out of thick papier-mâché, appliqued paper cutouts and painted backings. The witch's gingerbread house, the Hall of the Angels, and Hansel and Gretel's home were all constructed with trap doors underneath. Because the sets were so large, there was no way to reach and animate the figures except from below.

The film was shot in Myerberg's studio in New York. The puppets used in the film were called "kinemins." The bodies of the kinemins were sculpted in clay by James Summers and cast in foam latex by George Butler. Summers also painted the figures. The puppets were built to one-third scale and cost $2,500 each to build.

The witch character was renamed Rosina Rubylips. This differs from the original opera in which the witch tells Hansel that her name is Rosine Leckermaul (translated as Rosina Tastymuzzle).

The mother and father figures were sculpted to resemble Mildred Dunnock (Death of a Salesman) and Frank Rogier, who supplied their voices.

After production, the Hansel and Gretel sets were disassembled, carted away and eventually sold to an amusement park where they were poorly reconstructed in a tent for display. In 1955, vandals looted Myerberg's studio and destroyed the remaining kinemins.

In 1965, screenwriter Padraic Colum sold his copy of the screenplay (along with his notebooks, manuscripts, galley proofs and letters) to the Binghamton University Libraries, where it is available for research viewing.

In 1971, producer Myerberg donated his personal papers to the library of the University of Wisconsin–Madison. Hansel and Gretel is among the productions documented through correspondence, contracts, financial records, promotional materials, reviews and scripts.

Cast 
Anna Russell as Rosina Rubylips, the Witch
Mildred Dunnock as Mother
Frank Rogier as Father
Constance Brigham as Hansel and Gretel
Helen Boatwright as Dew Fairy
Delbert Anderson as Sandman
Apollo Boys’ Choir as Angels and Children

Release 
The film was released on October 10, 1954 in New York City without a distributor; producer Michael Myerberg released the film himself. Based on the positive reviews and box office performance, RKO Radio Pictures acquired the film for wide release for the Christmas season. The film was sold to television four years after it was released, where it became a Christmas-season tradition on several stations.

The film was rereleased theatrically in 1965 through New Trends Associates, and in March 1973 through Metro-Goldwyn-Mayer.

The film has been released on VHS, CED videodisc and DVD. The VHS and CED videodiscs contain the original title. The DVD was released on October 30, 2001 with the modified title of Hansel and Gretel: An Opera Fantasy.

An LP of the film's soundtrack was released in 1955 under the label "X" RCA, in 1959 under the label RCA Victor and in 1960 under the label RCA Camden. In 1959, it was nominated for a Grammy award in the category of Best Recording for Children.

Awards and nominations 
 1954 Parents' Magazine Medal for Movie of the Month (October)
 1959 Grammy Award nominee for Best Recording for Children (conductor Franz Aller)
 1995 Dove Foundation Family Approved Seal

Merchandise 
RKO heavily promoted the film in time for the 1954 Christmas season, including $10 million worth of products such as candy, clothing, figurines and toys.

A comic book adaptation was published by Dell Comics as issue #590 of its Four Color anthology series.

References

External links

Blog with history of the film and pictures
The Art of Evalds Dajevskis

1954 animated films
1954 films
1950s American animated films
1954 musical films
1950s children's animated films
American musical films
1950s stop-motion animated films
Films based on adaptations
Films based on Hansel and Gretel
Films based on operas
Films about witchcraft
RKO Pictures films
1950s English-language films